Jean Carroll (born Celine Zeigman, January 7, 1911 – January 1, 2010) was an American actress and comedian during the 1950s and 1960s.

Carroll was born as Celine Zeigman on January 7, 1911, in Paris, France. She began her career as part of the comedy dance team Carroll and Howe, with her husband, vaudevillian Buddy Howe, who later became her manager. She appeared on The Ed Sullivan Show more than 20 times and had her own short-lived sitcom The Jean Carroll Show (also known as Take It from Me), which aired for one season (1953–1954).

In November 2006, she was honored with an evening at the Friar's Club in New York City. The emcee was Joy Behar, and the main speaker was Lily Tomlin. In 2007, Carroll was featured in the Off-Broadway production The J.A.P. Show: Jewish American Princesses of Comedy, which includes live standup routines by four female Jewish comics juxtaposed with the stories of legendary performers from the 1950s and 1960s, Belle Barth, Pearl Williams and Betty Walker, Totie Fields, and Carroll. She later was featured in the 2009 PBS documentary Make 'em Laugh. In December 2019, Carroll's career was spotlit in "The Marvelous Mrs. Carroll," an episode of the podcast Adventures in Jewish Studies.

She died from natural causes on January 1, 2010, in White Plains, New York, at age 98, six days before her 99th birthday.

See also
The Actors' Temple

References

External links
 

1911 births
2010 deaths
20th-century American actresses
20th-century American comedians
Actresses from Paris
French emigrants to the United States
American people of French-Jewish descent
American women comedians
American television actresses
Jewish American actresses
American female dancers
American dancers
21st-century American Jews
21st-century American women